Еxtraphone - trademark of the Closed Joint Stock Corporation Rays Lis', is a player in the field of show-business in Russia. It specializes besides edition of musical production in organisation of concert performances, presentations, concert tours, as well as presentation of publicity space.

Awards

In 1996 Extraphone received a personal thank you letter from President Boris Yeltsin for organisation of the election campaign "Vote or You Will Lose".

Memberships

The company is member of IFPI and of RFA.

External links 
Extraphone Official site
Extraphone contact information
The Russian Phonographic Association

Russian record labels
Record labels established in 1995
Companies based in Moscow
Record label distributors